Nyamhongolo is an Ward in Ilemela District, Mwanza Region, Tanzania.In 2016 the Tanzania National Bureau of Statistics report there were 7,429 people in the ward.

In 2021 the new bus terminal for Mwanza was finished in Nyamongoro.

References

Wards of Mwanza Region
Ilemela District
Constituencies of Tanzania